Branko Sobot (born 12 January 1972 in Zagreb, Croatia) is a Croatian former professional boxer, who held the IBF Inter-Continental middleweight and super middleweight titles and challenged for the WBO World Super middleweight title, losing against Joe Calzaghe by 3rd-round TKO.

Amateur
Sobot became Croatian amateur champion in 1994 defeating Stjepan Božić by split decision.

Pro
Sobot's debut came on January 7, 1995, with a knockout of Bosnian, Savo Jankovic. On 1 March 1996, Sobot fought and defeated Orhan Ajvazoski for the German International middleweight title in Frankfurt and went on to make two more successful defences in the city and later two more in Offenbach and Oberhausen.
After nine wins, Sobot successfully fought for the IBF Inter-Continental middleweight title, defeating experienced title holder Salvador Yanez.

Sobots next major challenge came on January 25, 1997, when he faced future world champion Hacine Cherifi for the EBU (European) middleweight title. After a 12-round fight, the Frenchman defeated Sobot on points, Sobots only defeat after 11 wins.

On the January 24, 1998, Sobot made his first and only World title challenge. Moving up to Super Middleweight, he faced Joe Calzaghe who was making his first defence since winning the WBO World super middleweight title off Chris Eubank. Sobot was brought in as a late replacement for American Tarick Salmaci.
Despite beating the count after getting knocked down in the third round, the Croatian came under renewed punishment, with the Welshman landing blows from all angles, prompting the referee to stop the fight, making it Sobot's first TKO loss.

In November 1999, after two recovery wins back in Germany, Sobot faced unbeaten Mario Veit for the vacant German International super middleweight title, losing the ten round contest by unanimous decision.

His next fight was more successful, as he won the IBF Inter-Continental super middleweight title in his home country with a sixth round stoppage over Francis Fofoh. This took his career record up to 17-3-0 at the turn of the millennium, although the rest of his career would be less victory filled. In his next nine fights he would win just twice, facing tough competition against the likes of Danilo Haussler, Arthur Abraham, Mger Mkrtchyan and Konni Konrad.

On the 16 December 2004, Sobot fought his last bout, losing to undefeated and future WBO World super middleweight champion Denis Inkin by second-round TKO.

References

External links

1972 births
Living people
Sportspeople from Zagreb
Croatian male boxers
Middleweight boxers